Milton Heath and The Nower is a   nature reserve west of Dorking in Surrey. It is owned by Mole Valley District Council. 

This site has woodland, heath and grassland. Birds include green woodpeckers, great spotted woodpeckers, tawny owls, nuthatches and treecreepers.

There is access from Westcott Road.

Nature reserves in Surrey
Mole Valley